The 2021 Nottinghamshire County Council election took place on 6 May 2021 as part of the 2021 local elections in the United Kingdom. All 66 councillors were elected from 56 electoral divisions, which returned either one or two county councillors each by first-past-the-post voting for a four-year term of office.

Overall election results

Results by electoral division

Ashfield District
(10 seats, 10 electoral divisions)

Ashfields

Hucknall North

Hucknall South

Hucknall West

Kirkby North

Kirkby South

Selston

Sutton Central & East

Sutton North

Sutton West

Bassetlaw District
(9 seats, 9 electoral divisions)

Blyth & Harworth

Misterton

Retford East

Retford West

Tuxford

Worksop East

Worksop North

Worksop South

Worksop West

† The Conservative candidate for Worksop West, Lloyd Widdup, was suspended by the Conservative party in April 2021 pending the outcome of an investigation into social media posts. Widdup remains a validly nominated candidate and will appear on the ballot paper as such.

Broxtowe Borough
(9 seats, 7 electoral divisions)

Beeston Central & Rylands

Bramcote & Beeston North

Eastwood

Greasley & Brinsley

Nuthall & Kimberley

Stapleford & Broxtowe Central

Toton, Chilwell & Attenborough

Gedling Borough
(9 seats, 6 electoral divisions)

Arnold North

Arnold South

Calverton

Carlton East

Carlton West

Newstead

Mansfield District
(9 seats, 5 electoral divisions)

Mansfield East

Mansfield North

Mansfield South

Mansfield West

Warsop

Newark & Sherwood District
(10 seats, 10 electoral divisions)

Balderton

Blidworth

Collingham

Farndon & Trent

Muskham & Farnsfield

Newark East

Newark West

Ollerton

Sherwood Forest

Southwell

Rushcliffe Borough
(10 seats, 9 electoral divisions)

Bingham East

Bingham West

Cotgrave

Keyworth

Leake & Ruddington

Radcliffe On Trent

West Bridgford North

West Bridgford South

West Bridgford West

By-elections

Collingham

References

2021
 English local elections
21st century in Nottinghamshire